Kathleen Maria Margaret Archer ( Sissmore) MBE, known as Jane Sissmore, was the first female officer in Britain's Security Service, MI5, and was still their only woman officer at the time of her dismissal for insubordination in 1940. She had been responsible for investigations into Soviet intelligence and subversion. She then joined the Secret Intelligence Service (MI6), but when Kim Philby, later to be exposed as a double agent, became her boss he reduced her investigative work because he feared she might uncover his treachery.

In his memoirs, Philby wrote, "After Guy Liddell, Jane was perhaps the ablest professional intelligence officer ever employed by MI5". Following management changes in MI5, she returned there in 1945 or 1946.

Personal life 

Jane Sissmore, the daughter of John Edmund Angelo Sissmore and Kathleen Maud Forbes-Smith was born in Bengal on 11 March 1898 and moved to London in her early childhood with her parents and elder brother. Sissmore became head girl at Princess Helen's College, Ealing and was recruited to MI5 in 1916 as an eighteen-year-old clerk.  She has been described as "one of MI5's most remarkable wartime recruits". In her spare time she trained to be a barrister, becoming the fifth woman to be admitted to Gray's Inn, and, after obtaining first-class exam results, was called to the bar in 1924. The day before World War II broke out Sissmore, still MI5's only female officer, married Wing Commander John Oliver "Joe" Archer, CBE, who became the liaison officer between MI5 and the Royal Air Force. Jane Archer died in Dorset in September 1982.

MI5 – clerk and officer 

Appointed to MI5 in 1916 as typist/clerk, by 1929 Sissmore had become Controller of the Registry and of women staff. At the time, and until 1940, Vernon Kell was director of MI5. Sissmore was awarded the MBE in 1923 as an "Administrative Assistant, General Staff, War Office" and in 1929 moved to B Division (investigations and inquiries) where she was in charge of investigating Soviet intelligence and subversion activity. This made her MI5's first woman officer and she was to become what Christopher Andrew has described as a "formidable interrogator".

In 1937 Roger Hollis applied to join MI5 and Kell asked Sissmore to make an informal assessment of him which she did at her tennis club, also involving the then still junior Dick White. The formal interview panel rejected Hollis but he was nevertheless employed on Kell's decision provided Sissmore took responsibility for him. Thus Hollis became Sissmore's assistant (and went on to become MI5 Director-General in 1956).

Jane Archer's 1940 debriefing of Walter Krivitsky was done using the name "Mrs Moore" and it has been described by Christopher Andrew as "the first really professional debriefing of a Soviet Intelligence officer on either side of the Atlantic".
Krivitsky had been a Soviet agent in continental Europe who had defected to the West in 1937 and whose revelations in the United States in September 1939 had created a press sensation. In particular from a British point of view he revealed that two Soviet agents were currently working in Britain – the one whose surname he was able to give was quickly identified, tried and convicted of spying. His description of the other agent (cryptonym ) was more elusive. Archer suggested Krivitsky should be invited to Britain to be interviewed and he agreed to this.

The debriefing by Archer took four weeks and, to let Krivitsky feel he was highly valued, at the start she was accompanied by Valentine Vivian, head of counter-espionage at SIS, and Jasper Harker, head of B Division and Archer's boss. Then Archer took over the lead role and elicited a great deal of information. Archer's report (a "masterly analysis" according to Nigel West) was 85 pages long and much of it subsequently became incorporated in an MI5 overall review of Soviet intelligence activity.

Krivitsky's disclosures might have made it possible to work out that both Donald Maclean and Kim Philby were Soviet agents but this opportunity was missed. Andrew argues that the clues were too slight to have been usable. Chapman Pincher considers that Archer and Hollis were at fault but largely absolves Archer because she was almost immediately moved to completely different work. Hollis then filled her old post. Archer's debriefing completely transformed the understanding of the top echelons of MI5 about current Soviet espionage activity in Britain – they now realised it was extensive whereas only a year earlier it had wrongly been thought non-existent.  In January 1941 one such Soviet agent Anthony Blunt, who was working within MI5, passed Archer's entire report to his Soviet controller.

In October 1940, MI5 moved offices from unlikely temporary premises at Wormwood Scrubs Prison to the even less likely Blenheim Palace. At a top-level meeting at that venue in November Archer criticised Brigadier Harker, recently appointed acting director of MI5, for incompetence. Harker, who had previously been her head of division, then dismissed her. Concerning this Guy Liddell, director of counter-espionage, wrote of Harker "but for his incompetence, the situation would never have arisen" but he also thought that Archer had "unfortunately gone too far". Shortly afterwards David Petrie was appointed as the next director general and Harker was made his deputy – indeed Andrew's view is that Harker's dismissal of Archer probably contributed to Harker being put out to grass. For the rest of the war MI5 employed no other women as officers although several did work at this level of seniority.

Secret Intelligence Service 

Archer straight away took up a post in the Secret Intelligence Service (SIS) and was placed in charge of Irish section, within Section V, involved in analysing intelligence about suspect Irish political organisations. Espionage was not involved but an information service was provided to Whitehall of "events of political or public interest in Eire" – SIS had become involved because MI5 had refused to take this on.

Later during the war, in 1944, Archer transferred to Section IX which was concerned with Soviet and communist counter-intelligence with Kim Philby as head of section. It was unfortunate for both Archer and SIS that Philby, later to be unmasked as a Soviet "mole", recognised her considerable abilities. In his memoirs My Silent War Philby wrote:

Philby (who had himself been "the young English journalist") made efforts to guard against the threat of her uncovering his background and his current role as a Soviet agent. He later wrote "Jane would have made a very bad enemy". He therefore sidelined her and gave her the task of analysing intercepted radio traffic from Eastern Europe.

Archer's step-daughter Jean Collard has said that after Archer had started expressing suspicions about Philby she was "eased out of the intelligence services". So in 1944 things were not going well for Archer. Liddell wrote in his diary

Return to MI5 

Archer was encouraged to move back to MI5 and she was located in C Division which was concerned with security clearance. Petrie and Harker retired during 1946 to be replaced by Percy Sillitoe as director general and Liddell as his deputy.

Igor Gouzenko, a cipher clerk in Soviet embassy in Ottawa, defected in 1945 with a mass of documents, one of which led to the arrest of Alan Nunn May for spying. Philby recommended that Hollis rather than Archer should be sent to Canada to interview Gouzenko although he knew Archer would be better able to do the job. Agreeing this, MI5 sent Hollis and yet it was Philby at SIS who was apprised of progress and who altered, delayed and omitted messages before passing them on to MI5. By these means, Philby stopped Archer from having any involvement in the case.

In 1947 Klaus Fuchs was vetted by MI5 for work at Harwell on the British post-war atomic project. MI5 had only been informed that Fuchs was to do "Atomic Energy work of extreme importance", not that Britain was starting an independent atomic bomb development programme. C Division considered he should be removed from such work but B Division (counter-espionage) supported giving security clearance because of weak evidence against him and strong scientific references. Archer wrote a memo advising that the Atomic Energy Directorate should be warned that "Fuchs is a possible Russian agent ... [who] ... should be divorced from all contact with atomic energy". However, B Division's view prevailed. In 1949, in the aftermath of the test explosion of the Soviet Union's first atomic bomb, new United States Venona decrypts led the FBI to conclude that Fuchs had been a spy on the Manhattan Project and, although subsequent MI5 surveillance produced little evidence of his still being a spy, Fuchs confessed to espionage in both countries and he was sentenced to 14 years' imprisonment. Archer also recommended that Rudolf Peierls should not be allowed to continue as a consultant to Harwell but he went on to have a highly distinguished scientific career.

Archer was involved in following up further leads from the Venona decryption being carried out in the US at Arlington Hall. Early in 1951 MI5 were told that Krivitsky's  was actually Donald Maclean and they investigated him to try to find evidence that could be used in court. On account of his position in SIS Philby was kept apprised and so, as well as warning Moscow, he invented a pretext for requiring Guy Burgess, who was with Philby at the embassy in Washington, to be recalled to London so he could warn Maclean. A few days before Maclean was due to be arrested he and Burgess absconded to Russia. Burgess had not been under serious suspicion but the idea that the men had been warned led MI5 to suspect Philby for the first time. Archer and Arthur Martin were asked to compile a résumé of Philby's past – the coincidence with the "young English journalist" was noticed and Archer uncovered a slim MI5 file on him dating back to 1939. Presented with MI5's evidence and under pressure from Washington, the head of SIS still did not doubt Philby's loyalty but asked him to retire with a golden handshake.

In 1952, while examining the papers left in Burgess's flat, Archer found documents describing secret meetings that were then discovered to have been written by John Cairncross. Cairncross was tailed going to a meeting with his controller, Yuri Modin, but the actual meeting did not take place when the controller spotted the surveillance. Although Cairncross would not fully admit he was a spy, he was forced to resign and he moved to the United States.

In the 1960s Peter Wright and Arthur Martin conducted their own private enquiry into whether Hollis, director of MI5 or Graham Mitchell, deputy director, were traitors.
In Spycatcher, Wright says that Martin interviewed Archer and that later when Wright spoke to her she said she considered both men unreliable but suggested Hollis was more likely to be a spy. However, Christopher Andrew comments on an anecdote about Anthony Blunt

Notes

References

Citations

Works cited

Further reading

History of MI5 on its own website
History of SIS on its website
Guide to intelligence and security services records at the National Archives.
Security Service records at the National Archives
Krivitsky debriefing records at the National Archives
Secret Intelligence Service records at National Archives
Jane Archer biography at Spartacus Educational

MI5 personnel
Secret Intelligence Service personnel
Members of the Order of the British Empire
1898 births
1982 deaths